Bill Hanson (14 September 1893 – 3 December 1946) was an Australian rules footballer who played with Essendon in the Victorian Football League (VFL).

Notes

External links 
		

1893 births
1946 deaths
Australian rules footballers from Victoria (Australia)
Essendon Football Club players